Tshokatshaa is a village in Central District of Botswana. It is located 90 km west of Nata, to the north of the road connecting Nata to Maun. The village had a population of 458 in the 2001 census, and has a primary school.

References

Populated places in Central District (Botswana)
Villages in Botswana